Second Lieutenant Donald Simpson Bell, VC (3 December 1890 – 10 July 1916) was an English school teacher and professional footballer. During World War I he was awarded the Victoria Cross (VC) for actions during the Battle of the Somme in mid-1916, becoming the only English professional football player to be awarded the VC.

Football
Bell was born on 3 December 1890 to Smith and Annie Bell, who resided in Queen's Road, Harrogate. He attended St Peter's Church of England Primary School and Harrogate Grammar School before going to Westminster College, London, to train as a teacher. A noted sportsman at college, he played as an amateur with Crystal Palace and later for Newcastle United. He returned to Harrogate and became a schoolteacher at Starbeck Council School (now Starbeck Primary School) and a member of the National Union of Teachers. To supplement his salary, in 1912 he signed professional forms with Bradford (Park Avenue). He played 6 games for the club as a defender or midfielder between 1912–14.

World War I
When World War I broke out, he became the first professional footballer to enlist into the British Army – joining the West Yorkshire Regiment in 1915. He was promoted to Lance Corporal and then commissioned into the 9th Battalion, Green Howards (Alexandra, Princess of Wales' Own Yorkshire Regiment), going to France in November 1915. While on leave in June 1916 he married Rhoda Margaret  before returning to the front. After being in reserve for the opening of the battle of the Somme, the 9th battalion were ordered into the front line on 5 July.

Bell was awarded the Victoria Cross for his actions on 5 July 1916 at Horseshoe Trench, Somme, France.

Describing the deed in a letter to his parents, Bell stated that "I must confess that it was the biggest fluke alive and I did nothing. I only chucked one bomb, but it did the trick". Bell was shot in the head by a sniper on 10 July 1916 while attacking a machine-gun post near the village of Contalmaison. He is buried at Gordon Dump Cemetery, near Albert. His Victoria Cross was formerly displayed at the Green Howards Museum in Richmond, Yorkshire. On 25 November 2010 it was auctioned by London medal specialists, Spink. It was purchased for a reported £210,000 by the Professional Footballers' Association and is on display at the National Football Museum in Manchester.

Legacy
On 9 July 2000, through the initiative of "The Friends of the Green Howards Museum", General The Lord Dannatt, then Colonel of the regiment unveiled a memorial dedicated to Bell on the spot where he lost his life at Contalmaison, now known as Bell's Redoubt. The event was covered by television and every year since then a small service has been held there. In 2010, the tenth anniversary of the unveiling was celebrated and in 2016, at Bell's Redoubt, with a much improved memorial, there was scheduled to be a remembrance service on the hundredth anniversary of Bell's heroism.. There is a memorial plaque to him in Wesley Methodist Church, Harrogate, where he was a Sunday School Teacher.

Footnotes

References
Monuments to Courage (David Harvey, 1999)
The Register of the Victoria Cross (This England, 1997)
VCs of the First World War - The Somme (Gerald Gliddon, 1994)

Further reading
  Biography of Bell and his friend Captain Archie White VC.

External links

Donald Simpson Bell VC
Family announcements: Donald Simpson Bell VC

1890 births
1916 deaths
People from Harrogate
West Yorkshire Regiment soldiers
Green Howards officers
British Army personnel of World War I
British Battle of the Somme recipients of the Victoria Cross
Crystal Palace F.C. players
English footballers
Newcastle United F.C. players
Bradford (Park Avenue) A.F.C. players
British military personnel killed in the Battle of the Somme
Schoolteachers from Yorkshire
British Army recipients of the Victoria Cross
Footballers from North Yorkshire
Association football defenders
Association football midfielders
People educated at Harrogate Grammar School
Deaths by firearm in France
Military personnel from Yorkshire